Eduardo Román Quian Alcocer (born 1 December 1967) is a Mexican politician affiliated with the PRI. As of 2013 he served as Deputy of the LXII Legislature of the Mexican Congress representing Quintana Roo.

References

1967 births
Living people
Politicians from Michoacán
Members of the Chamber of Deputies (Mexico)
Institutional Revolutionary Party politicians
21st-century Mexican politicians
Members of the Congress of Quintana Roo
Municipal presidents in Quintana Roo